In archaeology a chopper core is a suggested type of stone tool created by using a lithic core as a chopper following the removal of flakes from that core. They may be a very crude form of early handaxe although they are not bifacially-worked and there is debate as to whether chopper cores were ever used as tools or simply discarded after the desired flakes were removed.

They are found in the early Mode 1 tool industries of the Oldowan and Clactonian industries during the Lower Palaeolithic.

References
Ashton, NM, McNabb, J, and Parfitt, S, Choppers and the Clactonian, a reinvestigation, Proceedings of the Prehistoric Society 58, pp21–28, qtd in Butler, C (2005). Prehistoric Flintwork, Tempus, Stroud. .

Lithics
Archaeological artefact types